The Australian National Championships was a touch football competition between the Australian states which ran from 1980 to 1995. The finals of this competition were almost always played between Queensland and New South Wales, the two most dominant touch playing states, with the Australian Capital Territory also performing strongly. The 'one sided' nature of the competition was the major reason for its replacement by the National Touch League format from 1997.

Results of the National Championships - 1980 to 1995

References

External links
Official site

Rugby league competitions in Australia
Touch competitions